Left-Hander (translit. Levsha) is a 1964 feature-length cutout-animated film from the Soviet Union. The film is based on the story of the same name by the 19th century Russian novelist Nikolai Leskov. It was directed by the "Patriarch of Soviet animation", Ivan Ivanov-Vano, at the Soyuzmultfilm studio.

The score was performed by the Government Symphony Orchestra, conducted by Grigori Gamburg.

Plot
The screen version of the narration of Nikolay Leskov about the surprising master Lefty who grounded a "aglitskaya" (English) steel flea.

Creators

Awards
1964 — the Honourable diploma at the VII International film festival short and documentaries in Leipzig.

Video
In 2008 was issued together with animated films "The Humpbacked Horse" 1947 and 1975 on DVD the Krupnyy Plan company.

Creation history
Ivanov-Vano bore an animated film plan about the gifted master in Leskov's story about 30 years. Over time he arrived at idea that the originality of the narration of Leskov can be transferred, having created a graphic row with a support on an art system of the Russian popular print with "its characteristic generality of forms, specific expressiveness". For animation the idea to show evolution of character of the main character was innovative. Art directors at creation of the movie were inspired by ancient engravings (action in the imperial palace), English engravings (the foreign line), and the Tula episodes were solved in the stylistics of a popular print which is organically uniting all three lines. According to the proposal of the animator of "Lefty" Yury Norstein, the movie became in equipment of a turn.

See also
History of Russian animation
List of animated feature films
List of stop-motion films

References

External links
Lefty at the Animator.ru

 (Official Russian)
Lefty at myltik.ru 

1964 films
Films directed by Ivan Ivanov-Vano
1960s Russian-language films
Films using stop-motion animation
Soviet animated films
Soyuzmultfilm
1964 animated films
Films based on short fiction